Drum is a village and townland in the west of County Monaghan in the Republic of Ireland. It is notable for being one of the only Protestant-majority settlements in the Republic of Ireland.

Location and name
Drum is situated between some lakes, such as Drum Lough to the north, Quarry Lough to the west, and Long Lough to the south.  It is named for the surrounding drumlin terrain.  Local people arranged signage at Drum Lough, which has duck.

The village lies on a minor road off the main Monaghan Town to Cootehill road, and the nearest larger settlements are Cootehill and Newbliss, site of the national writers' and artists' retreat facility, the Tyrone Guthrie Centre at Annaghmakerrig.

Character
Drum has a Church of Ireland church, one of the oldest Presbyterian congregations on the island of Ireland (although the current Presbyterian church was only built in the  1820s), a Free Presbyterian church and a Gospel Hall.  Unusually for Ireland, especially for the Republic of Ireland, Drum has no Catholic church in the actual village. The nearest Catholic church to the village is St. Joseph's Church, also known as Corrinshigo Chapel, parts of which were built  1870 and which was significantly altered in the 1960s, and is located less than two miles west of Drum.

The village also has a Protestant Hall, which hosts two Orange Lodges and an accordion band.  A blue plaque on the wall of the Protestant Hall commemorates John Deyell, who later founded a settlement in Canada.  There is also a branch of the Royal Black Preceptory, and the Drum Association, a local development association, which shares premises with the Wee Drummers childcare facility, but no GAA club.  There is a Protestant primary school, while the nearest secondary school is in Cootehill, a 15-minutes drive away.  Drum also participates in the Tidy Towns competition.  The village shop and the last local public house closed in the 2010s, and the nearest retail facilities are now in Cootehill.

Notable people

 Thomas Stinson, 1798 – 1864, merchant and landowner in Hamilton, Ontario
 Joseph Rutherford Dundas, 1836 – 1896, Canadian merchant and politician
 Heather Humphreys, 1963 -, Irish politician, Minister

See also
 List of towns and villages in the Republic of Ireland

References

Towns and villages in County Monaghan
Townlands of County Monaghan